USS Prestige is a name used more than once by the United States Navy:

 , a coastal minesweeper placed in service 23 December 1941.
 , a fleet minesweeper commissioned 11 September 1954.

United States Navy ship names